Mashtan (also Romanized as Mashtān; also known as Mashtūn) is a village in the Central District of Kazerun County, Fars Province, Iran. At the 2016 census, its population was 3,093, in 865 families.

References 

Populated places in Kazerun County